Thingyan (from Sanskrit saṁkrānti, which means "transit [of the Sun from Pisces to Aries]") is the Burmese New Year Festival that usually occurs in middle of April. Thingyan is the first ever water festival celebrated in the world or the earliest water festival in water festivals. Thingyan has been celebrated since the semi-legendary Tagaung period(1st-2nd century AD) of Myanmar and became widespread during the Bagan period (10-12th century AD). It is a Buddhist festival celebrated over a period of four to five days, culminating in the New Year. The dates of the Thingyan Festival are calculated according to the Burmese calendar. The dates of the festival are observed as public holidays throughout Myanmar, and are part of the summer holidays at the end of the school year. Water-throwing or dousing one another from any shape or form of vessel or device that delivers water is the distinguishing feature of this festival and may be done on the first four days of the festival. The New Year takes place at virtually the same time as the new year celebrations of many countries in South Asia like China (Dai People of Yunnan Province), Laos, Thailand, Cambodia, Nepal, Bangladesh, India, and Sri Lanka.

Thingyan is comparable to other festivities in the region such as the Songkran in Laos, the Songkran in Thailand, the Cambodian New Year, the Sinhalese New Year and the festivals like Vaisakhi (Punjab), Puthandu (Tamil Nadu), Vishu (Kerala) and Bihu (Assam) in India.

History

Thingyan is originated from the Buddhist version of a Hindu myth. The King of Brahmas called Arsi (အာသီ), lost a wager to the King of Devas, Śakra (သိကြားမင်း), who decapitated Arsi as agreed but the head of an elephant was put onto the Brahma's body who then became Ganesha. The Brahma was so powerful that if the head were thrown into the sea it would dry up immediately. If it were thrown onto land it would be scorched. If it were thrown up into the air the sky would burst into flames. Sakra, therefore, ordained that the Brahma's head be carried by one goddess after another taking turns for a year each. The new year henceforth has come to signify the changing of hands of the Brahma's head.

In a general theory, the sprinkling of water as a blessing and purification ritual came from Indosphere cultural concepts, but largely altered and localized by the Pyu-Burmese civilization into a unique water-splashing tradition because of the tropical climate. 

There is also several other traditional theories on the origin of the great water festival though nobody is entirely certain. But it can be safely assumed that Thingyan festival was already well-established during the Bagan period because the word "Thingyan/Thingkran" is found on an stone inscription of Saw Hla Wun pagoda dated to AD 1291.

‌Thingyan Eve

The eve of Thingyan, the first day of the festival is called Pre-day (in Myanmar), and is the start of a variety of religious activities. Buddhists are expected to observe the Eight Precepts, more than the basic Five Precepts, including having only one meal before noon. Thingyan is a time when uposatha observance days, similar to the Christian sabbath, are held. Alms and offerings are laid before monks in their monasteries and offerings of a green coconut with its stalk intact encircled by bunches of green bananas (nga pyaw pwè oun pwè) and sprigs of thabyay (Syzygium cumini) before the Buddha images over which scented water is poured in a ceremonial washing from the head down. In ancient times, Burmese kings had a hair-washing ceremony with clear pristine water from Gaungsay Kyun (lit. Head Washing Island), a small rocky outcrop of an island in the Gulf of Martaban near Mawlamyine.

Nightfall brings music, song and dance, and merrymaking in anticipation of the water festival. In neighbourhoods pavilions with festive names and constructed from bamboo, wood and beautifully decorated papier mache, are assembled overnight. Local girls rehearse for weeks and even years, in the run-up to the great event in song and dance in chorus lines. Each band of girls are uniformly dressed in colourful tops and skirts and wear garlands of flowers and tinsel. They wear fragrant thanaka - a paste of the ground bark of Murraya paniculata which acts as both sunblock and astringent - on their faces, and sweet-scented yellow padauk (Pterocarpus macrocarpus) blossoms in their hair. Padauk blooms only one day each year during Thingyan and is popularly known as the "Thingyan flower". Large crowds of revellers, on foot, bicycles and motorbikes, and in trucks, will do the rounds of all the mandat, some making their own music and most of the women wearing thanaka and padauk. Floats, decorated and lit up, also with festive names and carrying an orchestra as well as dozens of young men on each of them, will roam the streets stopping at every mandat exchanging songs specially written for the festival including Thingyan classics, and performing than gyat (similar to rapping but one man leads and the rest bellows at the top of their voices making fun of and criticising whatever is wrong in the country today such as fashion, consumerism, runaway inflation, crime, drugs, AIDS, corruption, inept politicians etc.). Accidents and incidents from drunk or reckless driving in crowded streets, as well as drunkenness, arguments and brawling are problems that typically occur. Generally however friendliness and goodwill prevail.

Water Festival

The next day called a-kya nei is when Thingyan fully arrives as Thagyamin makes his descent from his celestial abode to Earth. At a given signal, a cannon (Thingyan a-hmyauk) is fired and people come out with pots of water and sprigs of thabyay, then pour the water onto the ground with a prayer. A prophecy for the new year (Thingyan sa) will have been announced by the brahmins (ponna) and this is based on what animal Thagya Min will be riding on his way down and what he might carry in his hand. Children are told that if they have been good Thagya Min will take their names down in a golden book but if they have been naughty their names will go into a dog book.

Serious water throwing does not begin until a-kya nei in most of the country although there are exceptions to the rule. Traditionally, Thingyan involved the sprinkling of scented water in a silver bowl using sprigs of thabyay (Jambul), a practice that continues to be prevalent in rural areas. The sprinkling of water was intended to metaphorically "wash away" one's sins of the previous year. In major cities such as Yangon, garden hoses, huge syringes made of bamboo, brass or plastic, water pistols and other devices from which water can be squirted are used in addition to the gentler bowls and cups. Water balloons and even fire hoses have been employed. It is the hottest time of the year in the country and a good dousing is welcomed by most. All able-bodied individuals are included in this game, except for monks. Some overenthusiastic young lads may get captured by women, who often are their main target, and become kids of a practical joke with soot from cooking pots smeared on their faces. Maidens from mandats with dozens of garden hoses exchange hundreds of gallons of water with throngs of revelers and one float after another. Many revellers carry towels to block water from getting into the ears and for modesty as they get thoroughly soaked in their light summer clothes. The odd prankster might use ice water and a drive-by splash with this would be taken humorously. Pwè (performances) by puppeteers, orchestras, yein dance troupes, comedians, film stars and singers including modern pop groups are commonplace during this festival.

Modern-day celebrations

During the Water Festival, the Myanmar government relaxes restrictions on gatherings. In the former capital, Yangon, the government permits crowds to gather on the Kandawgyi Pat Lann and Kabaraye Roads. Temporary water-spraying stations, known as pandals, are set up and double as dance floors. Many of these pavilions are sponsored by rich and powerful families and businesses 

The third day is known as a-kyat nei and there may be two of them, as an extra day is added in certain years. The fourth day is known as a-tet nei when Thagya Min returns to the heavens, the last day of the water festival. Some would throw water at people late into the day making an excuse such as "Thagya Min left his pipe and has come back for it"! Over the long festive holiday, a time-honoured tradition is mont lone yay baw, glutinous rice balls with jaggery (palm sugar) inside thrown into boiling water in a huge wok and served as soon as they resurface which gave it the name. Young men and women help in making it and all are welcome, some have put a birdseye chilli inside instead of jaggery as a trick. Mont let saung is another Thingyan snack, made of bits of sticky rice with toasted sesame in jaggery syrup and coconut milk. They are both served with grated coconut. In major cities such as Yangon and Mandalay, Rakhine Thingyan can also be experienced as Rakhine residents of the city celebrate in their own tradition. Water is scooped from a long boat (laung hlei) to throw at revellers and Rakhine Mont di is served.

New Year's Day

The following is New Year's Day (hnit hsan ta yet nei). At this time Burmese visit elders and pay obeisance by gadaw (also called shihko) with a traditional offering of water in a terracotta pot and shampoo. Young people perform hairwashing for the elderly often in the traditional manner with shampoo beans (Acacia rugata) and bark. New year's resolutions are made, generally in the mending of ways and doing meritorious deeds for their karma. Releasing fish (nga hlut pwè) is another time-honoured tradition on this day; fish are rescued from lakes and rivers that are drying up, then the fish are kept in huge glazed earthen pots and jars before being released into larger lakes and rivers with a prayer and a wish saying "I release you once, you release me ten times". Thingyan (a-hka dwin) is also a common time for shinbyu, novitiation ceremonies for boys in the tradition of Theravada Buddhism when they will join the monks (Sangha) and spend a short time in a monastery immersed in the teachings of the Buddha, the Dhamma. It is akin to rites of passage or coming of age ceremonies in other religions.

On New Year's Day, people offer food donations called satuditha at various places. They typically provide free food to those participating in the new year's celebrations. Many Burmese to wash their heads with Tayaw, kinpun on Burmese new year's day so as to leave behind all the impurities and bad omens from the past.

Regional traditions
Rakhine State - The Rakhine people have three unique customs that form Thingyan, namely the nantha grinding ceremony, the nantha pouring ceremony and the water festival. On the evening of New Year's Eve, Rakhine girls assemble to grind blocks of nantha sandalwood (used as a traditional cosmetic in Burma) on a kyaukpyin (a flat, circular stone used to grind sandalwood), as part of a competition. The following morning, the Rakhine visit monasteries and pagodas to offer the ground nantha to Buddha statues, as a gesture of ushering the new year.
Mon State - As part of Thingyan traditions, the Mon people offer a festive dish called Thingyan rice, which consists of rice, dried snakehead fish, a generous sprinkle of fried onions, a few flakes of beeswax and served alongside a salad of unripe green mangoes.
Tanintharyi Region - The Bamar of Dawei and Myeik pay respects to elders and provide free meals to accompany Thaman Kyar dance performances.
Shan State - The Shan people call Thingyan "Sangkyan" and prepare a steamed sweetmeat called khaw mun haw, made of glutinous rice flour and jaggery, wrapped in banana leaf. This is offered to neighbors as a gift of goodwill.
Chittagong Hill Tracts in Southeastern Bangladesh - Marma people organize water pouring stages in their villages. The main participants are young boys and girls. Apart from water pouring, they also visit a monastery to make special offerings and pray for well-being in the coming year. Marmas commonly follow the Burmese calendar.

See also
Water Festival
List of Buddhist festivals
South and Southeast Asian New Year

References

Notes

External links
Thingyan 2004 photos by Gerry Haines
Thingyan Fun and Games
Old Thingyan photo of a float by Goto Osami
Thingyan Photos by Goto Osami
Thingyan Time - When Fun-Loving Burmese Douse Their Disappointments Yeni, The Irrawaddy, April 11, 2007
Thangyat: Traditional Songs Hard to Suppress The Irrawaddy, April 2008

April observances
Buddhist holidays
Buddhist festivals in Myanmar
Observances set by the Burmese calendar
New Year celebrations
Public holidays in Myanmar